The 1983 Munich WCT was a men's tennis tournament played on indoor carpet courts in Munich, West Germany. The tournament was part of the 1983 World Championship Tennis circuit. It was the fifth and final edition of the event and was held from 14 March until 20 March 1983. Unseeded Brian Teacher won the singles title.

Finals

Singles
 Brian Teacher defeated  Mark Dickson 1–6, 6–4, 6–2, 6–3
 It was Teacher's 1st singles title of the year and the 7th of his career.

Doubles
 Kevin Curren /  Steve Denton defeated  Heinz Günthardt /  Balázs Taróczy 7–5, 2–6, 6–1

References

External links
 ITF tournament edition details

Munich WCT
Munich WCT